The 2021–22 season was the 102nd season in the existence of SC Heerenveen and the club's 28th consecutive season in the top flight of Dutch football. In addition to the domestic league, SC Heerenveen participated in this season's edition of the KNVB Cup.

Players

First-team squad

Out on loan

Transfers

In

Out

Pre-season and friendlies

Competitions

Overall record

Eredivisie

League table

Results summary

Results by round

Matches
The league fixtures were announced on 11 June 2021.

European competition play-offs

KNVB Cup

References

SC Heerenveen seasons
SC Heerenveen